Santiago González and Artem Sitak were the defending champions but chose not to defend their title.

Marcelo Arévalo and Miguel Ángel Reyes-Varela won the title after defeating Brydan Klein and Ruan Roelofse 7–6(7–3), 7–5 in the final.

Seeds

Draw

References
 Main Draw

Jalisco Open - Doubles
2018 Doubles